(1667 – 1691) was a Japanese samurai of the Edo period. A senior retainer of the Sendai domain, he was first known as Masanaga (政長). Muranaga was also the fourth Katakura Kojūrō. His childhood name was Sannosueke (三之助) later changed to Kojūrō.

Family
 Father: Katakura Kagenaga (2nd)
 Mother: Jishō-in
 Wife: Matsumae Ichiko
 Son: Katakura Murayasu by Ichiko

External links
Katakura family tree (in Japanese)
Katakura-related timeline (in Japanese)

1667 births
1691 deaths
Samurai
Katakura clan